The Minnesota PGA Championship is a golf tournament that is the championship of the Minnesota section of the PGA of America. Although the Minnesota section was formed in August 1917, there were no section championships held until 1931.

Winners 

Source:

References

External links 
PGA of America – Minnesota section
Minnesota Golf: 90 Years of Tournament History

Golf in Minnesota
PGA of America sectional tournaments
Recurring sporting events established in 1931
1931 establishments in Minnesota